Michael Douglas Ford  (born Michael Douglas Aldo Ford Stirpe on March 25, 1994) is a Canadian politician who has been the Ontario minister of citizenship and multiculturalism since June 24, 2022. A member of the Progressive Conservative (PC) Party, he has represented York South—Weston in the Legislative Assembly of Ontario since 2022. Ford previously served on Toronto City Council from 2016 to 2022. First elected as a school trustee in 2014, he later won a 2016 by-election for the council seat which was vacated upon the death of Councillor Rob Ford, before he was elected as a member of Provincial Parliament (MPP) in 2022. He is the nephew of Doug Ford, the premier of Ontario and Rob Ford, the former mayor of Toronto.

Early and personal life
Ford was born on March 25, 1994 to Ennio Stirpe and Kathy Ford in Toronto, Ontario. He attended Richview Collegiate Institute in Etobicoke, graduating in 2012. He is the nephew of Doug Ford, the 26th premier of Ontario, and Rob Ford, the 64th mayor of Toronto. He is the grandson of Doug Ford Sr., who was an MPP.

In 2014, Ford changed his surname from Stirpe to Ford, and removed Aldo from his given name. His father was convicted of manslaughter in 2009 and convicted of attempted murder in 2012. He is currently incarcerated and serving an 18-year prison term for attempted murder.

In June 2020, Ford tested positive for COVID-19.

Political career

2014 municipal election 
In the 2014 municipal election, Ford was initially a candidate for Toronto City Council in Ward 2 Etobicoke North, but dropped out when his uncle, Rob Ford, withdrew from the mayoral race after being diagnosed with an abdominal tumour. Rob Ford then registered to run for the council seat, while Michael transferred his candidacy to the school board race.

During an interview with The Globe and Mail, Michael Ford acknowledged that his last name helped him get elected, but stated that he is his own man, and unlike his uncles. His colleagues on the school board were very concerned when Ford was elected due to his uncles' public lives in politics, but one of his colleagues, Marit Stiles, told the Globe that Ford was a hard worker, eager to learn, and wasn't afraid to ask questions. He also quickly earned a reputation for being more politically moderate and conciliatory than his uncles — including expressing admiration of Justin Trudeau, whom both of his uncles were known for criticizing, and attending Toronto's Pride Week parade.

Toronto City Council 
Councillor Rob Ford died on March 22, 2016, at which time the council seat in Ward 2 was declared vacant. After city council declared on May 6 that a by-election would be held to fill the seat, Michael Ford announced he would resign his trustee position to run for council.

He won the by-election, winning 69.53 per cent of the vote over 11 other challengers. At 22, he is the youngest person in recent history to be elected to council.

Ford ran for re-election in the 2018 municipal election in the newly expanded Ward 1 Etobicoke North. He defeated fellow incumbent councillor Vincent Crisanti.

Provincial politics 
In April 2022, Ford announced that he would run in the June provincial election in York South—Weston, for the Progressive Conservative Party.

He was appointed Minister of Citizenship and Multiculturalism in the Ford Ministry.

Election results

See also 

 Ford family (Canada)

References

1994 births
Living people
Toronto city councillors
Toronto District School Board trustees
Canadian people of Italian descent
Ford political family
Progressive Conservative Party of Ontario MPPs
21st-century Canadian politicians
Members of the Executive Council of Ontario